The Théâtre de l'Archevêché is a theatre in Aix-en-Provence in southern France and the home of the annual summer Aix-en-Provence Festival of opera.

See also
List of opera festivals

External links
 Festival d'Aix-en-Provence official website

Buildings and structures in Aix-en-Provence
Archeveche
Tourist attractions in Aix-en-Provence